Burya can refer to:

 Burya, a Russian cruise missile
 Burya (village), a village in Bulgaria
 Burya Point, a rocky point in Antarctica
 Burya, a Ukrainian-Canadian band founded by Ron Cahute